The Hundred of Smith is a hundred in the County of Robe, in the Limestone Coast region of South Australia.

References

Limestone Coast
Smith